Cook Islands have competed in two editions of the Rugby League World Cup. They were eliminated at the group stage on both occasions.

Tournament results

Tournaments

2000

2013

2021

References

External links 

Cook Islands national rugby league team
Rugby League World Cup